The Church of Jesus Christ of Latter-day Saints in Austria refers to the Church of Jesus Christ of Latter-day Saints (LDS Church) and its members in Austria. Most of the growth of the church in Austria occurred during the 1960s.  This growth has since slowed.  In 2009 there were 4,203 members in 17 congregations (12 wards and 5 branches).  In 2021, there were 4,662 members in 17 congregations (14 wards and 3 branches). Nationwide active membership is likely between 1,600 and 1,800, or 35-38% of total membership.

History

Prior to World War I, the LDS Church had difficulties establishing itself in Austria due to existing laws.  Even with that, the first Latter-day Saint visit to Austria was Orson Hyde in 1842, who briefly passed through on his way to Palestine. The first missionaries arrived in 1865 but were banished later that year. The first Austrian convert was Joseph A. Oheim who was baptized in Munich, Germany on January 22, 1870.  The first convert baptized in Austria was Paul Haslinger who was baptized on November 25, 1883. The first branch was established in Haag am Hausruck in 1902. In 1909, a second congregation was formed in Vienna but was closed by Police in 1914.

The LDS Church enjoyed religious freedom following World War I.  The first district in Austria was formed in 1920 with the district leadership centered in Vienna and encompassed other cities such as Linz and Salzburg.  During World War II, missionaries and some local members left Austria.  After World War II, the church provided humanitarian aid programs in Austria and other European countries under direction of Ezra Taft Benson.  On September 27, 1955, Austria granted official recognition of the LDS Church. 

The Vienna Austria Stake was organized on April 20 1980, and another stake in Salzburg was organized on January 19, 1997.

Stakes 

As of February 2023, the following stakes exist in Austria:

Missions
Austria is currently part of the church's Alpine German-Speaking Mission. This mission encompasses Austria, Liechtenstein, and portions of Germany & Switzerland.

Temples 
On April 4, 2021, the intent to construct the Vienna Austria Temple was announced by church president Russell M. Nelson.

See also
Religion in Austria

References

External links
 The Church of Jesus Christ of Latter-day Saints (Austria) - Official Site (German)
 The Church of Jesus Christ of Latter-day Saints - Austria Newsroom (German)
 ComeUntoChrist.org Latter-day Saints Visitor site
 FindeChristus.org